The Neranleigh-Fernvale beds is a geologic formation in the north east of New South Wales and Queensland, Australia.

Description 
This formation contains a heterogeneous succession of sandstone. Either derived from volcanic action, or locally oolitic. Other constituents include siltstone, chert and minor mafic volcanics including pillow basalt. Conglomerate and jasper, with low metamorphosed greenschist are also present. Basaltic volcanics are interbedded with the Neranleigh-Fernvale sediments. Fossils are rarely encountered.

See also 
 Clarence-Moreton Basin

References 

Geologic formations of Australia
Carboniferous System of Australia
Devonian System of Australia
Carboniferous volcanism
Sandstone formations
Siltstone formations
Conglomerate formations
Geology of New South Wales
Geology of Queensland